Kayseri University (Turkish Kayseri Üniversitesi), is a public university located in Kayseri, Turkey. It was founded on 18 May 2018 by the separation from Erciyes University.

The main campus of Kayseri University, 15 Temmuz Campus, is located in Talas district. As of 2021, Kayseri University is one of three public university was established in Kayseri province.

Academic units 
As of 2021, the university has five faculties, one institute and eleven vocational schools.

Faculties 

 Faculty of Applied Science
 Faculty of Islamic Sciences
 Faculty of Social and Human Sciences 
 Faculty of Architecture and Design 
 Faculty of Health Sciences

Institute 

 Graduate School

Vocational schools 

 Bünyan Vocational School 
 Develi Hüseyin Şahin Vocational School
 İncesu Vocational School
 Mustafa Çıkrıkçıoğlu Vocational School
 Pınarbaşı Vocational School
 Safiye Çıkrıkçıoğlu Vocational School
 Vocational School of Social Sciences 
 Tomarza Mustafa Akıncıoğlu Vocational School 
 Yahyalı Vocational School 
 Yeşilhisar Vocational School 
 İncesu Vocational School

See also 

 List of universities in Turkey

References

External links 

 Iskenderun Technical University Official Website (In English)
 Study in Turkey - Council of Higher Education Official Website (Kayseri University)

Universities and colleges in Turkey
Educational institutions established in 2018
2018 establishments in Turkey